Lithops werneri is a species of plant in the family Aizoaceae. It is endemic to Namibia.  Its natural habitat is rocky areas.

Several recent visitors over a period of years to the only known habitat of Lithops werneri report that no plants could be found  and it may possibly be extinct.

References

werneri
Endemic flora of Namibia
Vulnerable plants
Taxonomy articles created by Polbot